Roderick William Coleman  (19 June 1926 – 6 August 2019) was a Grand Prix motorcycle road racer from New Zealand who raced for AMC (Associated Motorcycles) riding AJS motorcycles both at the Isle of Man TT, and in the Grand Prix World Championship in Europe, between 1951 and 1956. He was the first official entrant from the New Zealand Auto-Cycle Union in the 1949 Isle of Man TT, but crashed in practice, and in 1954 became the first New Zealander to win a TT.

Background
Coleman was the son of Percy "Cannonball" Coleman, also from Wanganui, who first raced at the 1930 Isle of Man TT but retired from the 1930 Junior TT and Senior TT Races. The first New Zealand competitor to enter the TT was Alan Woodman who entered the 1910 Isle of Man TT races, but lost a leg in a practice crash. The "TT Special" of 1951 describes Rod Coleman as a "motorcycle dealer from Wanganui", then aged 25 years.

Racing career
In 1951, Coleman secured a works contract with the British manufacturer, Associated Motorcycles, who produced AJS, and Matchless machines. He rode an AJS to eighth place in the Isle of Man Junior TT, while his Norton failed to finish the Senior TT. In the 1951 Grand Prix season, he finished 12th in the final 350 class standings.

In 1952 he came fourth in the Senior TT, and third in the Junior TT, riding AJS in both events. He was fourth in the 1952 500 class standings.

For 1953 there was a fourth in the Senior TT, and while leading the Junior TT, his bike broke down and failed to finish. For the 1953 season, he was tenth in the 500 class and sixth in the 350 class.

In 1954 he won the Junior, the first New Zealander to win a TT. In the 1954 Grand Prix motorcycle racing season, Coleman came twelfth in the 500 class, and third in the 350 class. This was also the year Associated Motorcycles quit racing. He won the 500cc in Hedemora TT in 1954

Coleman met and married an English woman, Jacqueline Etherington, and they returned to Wanganui where he ran a thriving motorcycle and car business. In the 2001 New Year Honours, Coleman was appointed a Member of the New Zealand Order of Merit, for services to motorcycling. He died in Whanganui on 6 August 2019.

References

1926 births
2019 deaths
Sportspeople from Whanganui
New Zealand motorcycle racers
Isle of Man TT riders
350cc World Championship riders
500cc World Championship riders
Place of birth missing
Members of the New Zealand Order of Merit